Julius Chestnut (born October 26, 2000) is an American football running back for the Tennessee Titans of the National Football League (NFL). He played college football at Sacred Heart.

Professional career

Chestnut signed with the Tennessee Titans as an undrafted free agent in 2022. Following the final roster cuts made by the Titans, Chestnut, along with fellow undrafted rookie Tre Avery, made the team. After being inactive the first three games, he was waived on October 1, 2022. He was re-signed to the practice squad on October 4. He was promoted to the active roster on December 17, 2022.

References

External links
Sacred Heart Pioneers bio
Tennessee Titans bio

Living people
Tennessee Titans players
Sacred Heart Pioneers football players
American football running backs
2000 births